Leopold's Ice Cream is an ice cream parlor located in Savannah, Georgia, United States. It was founded in 1919 by two Greek-immigrant brothers, George and Peter Leopold, who had moved to Savannah from Brazil, Indiana, to be near their sister, Demetra, who had married Savannah local George Paul Carellas. The business was closed by current co-owner Stratton Leopold in 1969; he reopened it at a new location 35 years later with his wife.

History
Leopold's original location, Leopold's Purest Ice Cream, was at the northeastern corner of East Gwinnett Street and Habersham Street, a former fruit stand in the Historic District - South, a few blocks east of Forsyth Park. Peter Leopold, having just returned from serving in the First World War in France, was speaking to the owner of the fruit stand, a fellow Greek, while waiting for a streetcar. Leopold inquired about starting a business there, and shortly afterwards he and his older brother, George, bought the store, with Peter and his son, Stratton, living on the second floor. They began selling chocolates, food and ice cream. Basil Leopold joined them in 1925.

The brothers utilized the French pot process they had learned from master confectioner James Peter Zarafonetis back in Indiana, making five- and ten-gallon batches of ice cream in-house from their own recipes and using fresh cream, milk and eggs from local dairy farms.

The brothers remodeled the shop in 1935, modernizing it and launching an improved delivery service.

Peter's youngest child, Stratton Leopold, took over the business with his mother, Marika, after his father's death in 1963 (George had died two years previous). Stratton closed the shop in 1969, and left Savannah for Hollywood, via New York City, where he is now a film producer, director and actor. Ice cream and sweet treats continued to be served across town at Basil Leopold's Restaurant, which opened in 1962 at Medical Arts Shopping Center. After her husband's death in 1981, Pina Leopold continued to run the store for a year, before selling the store and retiring.

In August 2004, Leopold's moved to its present home on East Broughton Street, in Savannah's downtown, where it is known for regularly having a line of customers waiting outside. Stratton Leopold hired Hollywood production designer Dan Lomino to recreate his father's soda fountain from the original store. The ice cream is made, using the same recipes developed by his father and uncle, at a former wholesale florist building at 37th and Price Streets and brought over to the store as necessary.

The company also has a kiosk and a full-service shop at Savannah/Hilton Head International Airport.

Leopold's signature flavor is tutti frutti, a favorite of Savannah's Johnny Mercer, who worked in the shop as a ten-year old, sweeping floors, while former U.S. President Jimmy Carter's favorite is the butter pecan. Carter wrote the foreword to Leopold's Ice Cream: A Century of Tasty Memories, 1919–2019 (Melanie Bowden Simón, 2020).

The company celebrated its centenary on August 18, 2019, and held a block party the previous day.

Gallery

References

External links
Official website

Ice cream brands
Ice cream parlors in the United States
Restaurants established in 1919
Companies based in Savannah, Georgia
Tourist attractions in Savannah, Georgia
American companies established in 1919